Sebastian Wang-Hansen (born 6 June 1988) is a Norwegian sailor. He was born in Tønsberg, and represents the Royal Norwegian Yacht Club. He competed in sailboard at the 2012 Summer Olympics in London.

References

External links

 

Norwegian male sailors (sport)
1988 births
Living people
Sportspeople from Tønsberg
Sailors at the 2012 Summer Olympics – RS:X
Olympic sailors of Norway
Norwegian windsurfers